Mohammadabad (also Romanized as Moḩammadābād) is a village in Bandan Rural District, in the Central District of Nehbandan County, South Khorasan Province, Iran. At the 2006 census, its population was 133, in 23 families.

References 

Populated places in Nehbandan County